The 2011–12 Lega Pro Seconda Divisione season was the thirty-fourth football league season of Italian Lega Pro Seconda Divisione since its establishment in 1978, and the fourth since the renaming from Serie C to Lega Pro.

It was divided into two phases: the regular season, and the playoff phase.

Historically, the league was composed of 54 teams divided into three divisions of 18 teams each.  This year, due to a significant reduction in qualified teams, it was decided that the league would be composed of 40 teams divided into two divisions (gironi) divided geographically.  Catanzaro was re-admitted to the league after being previously excluded, increasing the number of teams to 41. Girone A is composed of 20 teams, and girone B is composed of 21 teams.

Teams finishing first and second in the regular season, plus one team winning the playoff round from each division will be promoted to Lega Pro Prima Divisione.  The last three teams in the regular season, plus one relegation play-out loser from each division will be relegated to Serie D.  The two relegation play-out winners, one from each division, will play each other and the loser will become the ninth team relegated. In all, six teams will be promoted to Lega Pro Prima Divisione, and nine teams will be relegated to Serie D.

Events

Before the start of the season
On 1 July 2011 Lega Pro announces that four teams (Canavese, Crociati Noceto, Rodengo Saiano, Sangiovannese) would not join the Seconda Divisione League for 2011–12 season.

On 12 July Brindisi, Cavese, Cosenza, Matera and Sanremese did not appeal against the exclusion and were consequently relegated to Eccellenza or lower divisions.

On 9 August 2011 Alessandria relegated to the last place in 2010–11 Lega Pro Prima Divisione by Italian national disciplinary committee for match fixing. Monza readmitted in Lega Pro Prima Divisione in its place.

Winter champions 
The winter champions were Casale in Group A and Perugia in Group B.

Girone A

Teams

League table

Results

Promotion Playoffs

Semifinals
First legs scheduled 20 May 2012; return legs scheduled 27 May 2012

Final
First leg scheduled 3 June 2012; return leg scheduled 10 June 2012

Cuneo promoted to Lega Pro Prima Divisione.

Girone B

Teams

1Initially played in Stadio Pasquale Iannello in Frattamaggiore as Neapolis Frattese, but returned in Mugnano di Napoli in December 2011.

League table

Results

Promotion Playoffs

Semifinals
First legs scheduled 20 May 2012; return legs scheduled 27 May 2012

Final
First leg scheduled 3 June 2012; return leg scheduled 10 June 2012

Paganese promoted to Lega Pro Prima Divisione.

Relegation play-off
only Finals winner is saved from relegation
other 3 teams are relegated to Serie D

Semifinals

Girone A 
First legs scheduled 19 May 2012; return legs scheduled 27 May 2012

Lecco relegated to Serie D

Girone B 
First legs scheduled 20 May 2012; return legs scheduled 27 May 2012

Neapolis Mugnano relegated to Serie D

Final 
First leg scheduled 3 June 2012; return leg scheduled 10 June 2012

Vibonese relegated to Serie D

References

2011-12
4
Italy